Ilex anomala, commonly known as Hawai'i holly, kāwau or aiea, is a species of holly that is endemic to Hawaii.

References

External links

Trees of Hawaii
Endemic flora of Hawaii
anomala
Flora without expected TNC conservation status